The following highways are numbered 414:

Canada
 Newfoundland and Labrador Route 414

Costa Rica
 National Route 414

Japan
 Japan National Route 414

United States
  Florida State Road 414
  Georgia State Route 414 (unsigned designation for former proposed Interstate 420
  Louisiana Highway 414
  Maryland Route 414
  New York State Route 414
  Oregon Route 414
  Pennsylvania Route 414
  Puerto Rico Highway 414
  South Carolina Highway 414
  Wyoming Highway 414